Trident Media Group, LLC is an American literary agency that represents authors across several categories including print publishing, eBooks, audiobooks, book translations, book-to-film/TV adaptation, stage adaptation and new media. Trident Media Group is based out of New York City. The literary agency launched in 2000 by Robert Gottlieb and Dan Strone. Since Trident Media Group's inception, it has published the work of American and foreign authors in the US and abroad and distributed them both in print and other media formats.

History

Trident Media group was co-founded in September, 2000 by Robert Gottlieb and Dan Strone, two literary agents and former senior executives of William Morris Agency from New York. According to Variety Magazine, in the autumn of 2002, the Trident Media Group literary agency merged with the Ellen Levine Literary Agency (established in 1980) and expanded its presence in the new market niche including literary fiction, commercial fiction and nonfiction.

In April, 2010, Trident Media Group started an experimental project with Vook to create vooks or digital books of mixed-media form that blends video, text, images and social streams in one context. The project discontinued since Vook formally ceased to exist in 2017. In 2011, TMG launched an Ebook division which allowed its authors to have optional access to digital media platforms such as Amazon, Barnes & Noble etc.

As of April, 2020, TMG had several departments including a Foreign Rights Department, Digital Media & Marketing (2011), Book to TV & Film Department and more.

Notable authors

Trident Media Group authours include Kevin J. Anderson, Larry Bond, Dale Brown, Brian Herbert, Stephen J. Cannell, Tori Carrington, Isaac Asimov, Julian LennonAnn-Margret, Buzz Aldrin, Richard Myers, Peter Bart, Meredith Baxter, Igor Bergler (The Lost Bible's author), Amish Tripathi, Clea KoffRex Pickett, James Breakwell, Trinidad Escobar, Andrew Klavan, William F. Nolan, Melina Matsoukas, Megan Phelps-Roper, Chris Abani, Gil Adamson, André Alexis, Christopher Andersen, Elisabeth Tova Bailey and many others.

References

Book publishing companies of the United States
Publishing companies established in 2000
Book publishing companies based in New York (state)
Publishing companies based in New York City
2000 establishments in New York (state)